Tuntari is a 2016 Telugu sports comedy film directed by Kumar Nagendra and produced by Ashok and Nagarjun on Sri Keerthi Films. Starring Nara Rohit and Latha Hegde are playing the lead roles. The film is a remake of the Tamil film Maan Karate.

Plot
When a group of five IT professionals decide to go trekking to a nearby forest area, they come across a sage. They chase down the sage, and to test if he holds real supernatural powers, one of them asks him to produce a newspaper, which is printed on the day after Dusshera, as he knows that all publications are closed on Dusshera and that there would be no newspaper the next day. The sage produces this edition, and goes off into the forest. When they open the newspaper, they find out that the company that they are working for, which got shut four months ago, is soon to start operations. And they also find out from the paper that a particular Raju, whose father is a BSNL employee, would go on to win a boxing championship, and give the prize money of Rs. 5 crores to these five IT professionals. Elated with this, they start searching for Raju and finally nab him in Vizag. On the other hand, Raju is a carefree guy who is jobless and spends his life without any aim. The rest of the story is as to how this group convince Raju to learn boxing and win the prestigious competition.

Cast
Nara Rohit as Raju
Latha Hegde as Siri
Kabir Duhan Singh as Killer Raju
Pujita Ponnada as Poojitha
Vennela Kishore
Sanjay Reddy as Killer Raju's father-in-law
Ali
Shakalaka Shankar
Raghu Karumanchi
Sanjay Swaroop

Production

Filming 
The film was formally launched at Satyasai Nigamagamam on 12 June 2015.

Casting 
Kabir Singh was cast to play the antagonist role in this film.

Soundtrack

The soundtrack was composed by Sai Karthik and released by Aditya Music.

References

External links
 

2010s Telugu-language films
2016 films
Indian boxing films
Telugu remakes of Tamil films
Indian sports comedy films
Films scored by Sai Karthik